The Laurence Olivier Award for Most Promising Performer was an annual award presented by the Society of London Theatre in recognition of achievements in commercial London theatre. The awards were established as the Society of West End Theatre Awards in 1976, and renamed in 1984 in honour of English actor and director Laurence Olivier.

This commingled actor/actress award was introduced in 2002, was also presented in 2003, then was retired. On the two occasions that this award was given, it was presented to an actor.

Winners and nominees

2000s

References

External links
 

Laurence Olivier Awards